Mehmood Abdul Razzaque is a Pakistani politician who had been a Member of the Provincial Assembly of Sindh, from May 2013 to May 2018.

Early life and education
He was born on 9 March 1976 in Karachi.

He has a degree of Bachelors of Commerce from Karachi University.

Political career

He was elected to the Provincial Assembly of Sindh as a candidate of Mutahida Quami Movement from Constituency PS-116 KARACHI-XXVIII in 2013 Pakistani general election.

In April 2017, he announced to quit MQM and join Pak Sarzameen Party.

References

Living people
Sindh MPAs 2013–2018
1976 births